Winter Thrice is the tenth studio album by Norwegian heavy metal band Borknagar. This is the only album to feature drummer Baard Kolstad and the last to feature longtime members Vintersorg and Jens F. Ryland.

Track listing

Personnel

Borknagar
Andreas Hedlund (credited as "Vintersorg") – clean vocals, harsh vocals, choirs
Simen Hestnæs (credited as "ICS Vortex") – clean vocals, choirs 
Øystein G. Brun – electric guitar
Jens F. Ryland – lead guitar
Lars A. Nedland – clean vocals, choirs, keyboards 
Baard Kolstad – drums, percussion

Guest Musicians
Kristoffer Rygg (credited as "Fiery G.") - lead vocals (on "Winter Thrice"), additional vocals (on "Terminus")
Simen Daniel Børven - bass guitar
Pål Mathiesen - additional vocals (on "Erodent")

Staff
Jens Bogren - mixing, mastering
Christophe Szpajdel – logo

Charts

References 

2016 albums
Borknagar albums
Century Media Records albums